Stander is a 2003 South African biographical film directed by Bronwen Hughes, about Captain André Stander, a South African police officer turned bank robber, starring Thomas Jane, who initially turned down the role. The filmmakers were able to talk to Allan Heyl, one of Stander's accomplices who was still imprisoned; Cor van Deventer, his police partner; and the warden of the prison where Andre was incarcerated.

Plot
Andre Stander is an officer with the South African Police, newly married with a rising reputation as the youngest captain on the force. He and his partner are assigned along with other officers to riot duty in the wake of the Soweto uprising. In the chaos of one of the riots in Tembisa, Stander shoots a young, unarmed protester, which deeply affects him and causes him to become disillusioned towards the apartheid system. One day on his lunch break Stander decides to spontaneously walk in and rob a bank. He thoroughly enjoys the rush and decides to embark on a spree of robberies, even responding to one in his official capacity as an officer. In the wake of these robberies, Cor Van Deventer, Stander's partner, leads a team assigned to take down the new bank robber. Eventually being able to see through Stander's disguises, Van Deventer's team finally makes the arrest. Stander is stripped of his position and sentenced to 32 years in prison.

While in prison Stander meets two other men, Lee McCall and Allan Heyl, with whom he quickly fosters a friendship. The trio have grand plans of what they will do when they get out, even saying that when they do they will come back for each other. After a year or so in prison Stander and McCall go to play a rugby game with other prisoners. During the game they feign serious injury and are taken to the infirmary, where they knock the doctor unconscious and relieve the guards of their weapons. Shortly after their escape Stander and McCall return for Heyl, the three introduce themselves to each other as their new assumed names and proceed to rob a few banks, purchase a high-priced safehouse, and steal a yellow Porsche 911 Targa.

As the robberies continue, the risks that come with it increase exponentially, as the so-called "Stander Gang" is being relentlessly pursued by the police task force under none other than Cor Van Deventer. After a gunshop hold-up that left a woman shot as well as able to identify the gang, McCall dropping money on the way out of a bank, and McCall's unexplained shooting spree at another bank that lead to a police chase, the gang soon sees that their luck is running out as they become increasingly more reckless. Deciding it would be best to cut their losses and settle down Stander comes up with a plan to rob the exchange office at the airport and leave South Africa, using a combination of flight schedules and disguises to come up with the best plan. Hours before the robbery is to take place Stander returns to Tembisa to make his final peace with the father of the protester he killed, and is instead beaten with a club by the boy's father. As McCall becomes infuriated with the fact Stander did not come to pull off the robbery, he and Heyl see on the news that if they were to have gone to the airport a large number of police would have arrested or killed them, leading Heyl to say "Even when he's wrong, he's right."

In 1984, the gang begins to organise their exit strategy when Stander goes off to Cape Town to purchase a boat and Heyl plans to go to Greece. However, McCall's plans are cut short when a squad of police surround the safehouse. While driving to see McCall, Heyl tells Stander a story about his relationship with a black woman. She had become pregnant (not by Heyl) and the two were living together, when police saw this they beat her to the point of miscarriage. Heyl thanks Stander for all he has done to help him and McCall get their revenge on the system and how the last six months had been the time of him and his friend's lives. Meanwhile, back at the safehouse McCall scrambles for an escape, but realising there is no way out he decides to grab two pistols and begin shooting at police. Stander and Heyl pull up just in time to see McCall gunned down by police. As they drive from the scene Stander and Deventer lock eyes, a police chase ensues and the Porsche is severely damaged, leading Stander and Heyl to steal another vehicle and drive off into the distance. Heyl and Stander part ways to go off and escape South Africa. Stander, who is being followed by numerous policemen, rushes  to the airport where he is forced to show identification. Deventer frantically rushes to see if it is Stander, but stops when he finds out that it was a false alarm (due to Stander's use of a fake passport) and Stander is allowed to leave.

Finally arriving in Fort Lauderdale (Florida, USA), Stander is unable to remain inactive for long when he hotwires a Mercury Cougar and runs a red light in front of police. Leading them on a short chase, Stander exits his vehicle and begins to disobey the officer's orders, prompting the officer's partner to grab a shotgun and threaten Stander with it. Stander disarms the partner only to be shot by the officer multiple times.

Cast
 Thomas Jane as Andre Stander
 Deborah Kara Unger as Bekkie Stander
 Ashley Taylor as Captain Cor Van Deventer
 David O'Hara as Allan Heyl
 Dexter Fletcher as Lee McCall
 Melanie Merle as Sharmaine
 Marius Weyers as General Francois Jacobus Stander
 At Botha as General Constand Viljoen
 Tessa Jubber as Florida Girl
 Ron Smerczak as Cop

Reception
Stander received mostly positive reviews from critics. Movie magazine Empire gave it four stars out of five saying "a star turn that shifts Jane up a notch or two and a career best performance". Nev Pierce of the BBC gave it four stars as well. It is rated Fresh at 72% on the Rotten Tomatoes website.

Awards and nominations (2005)
 The film was nominated for a Genie Award for Best Achievement in Direction.

References

External links

Apartheid films
2000s heist films
2000s crime films
2003 films
Afrikaans-language films
2000s English-language films
English-language South African films
Zulu-language films
Films set in South Africa
South African biographical films
Films shot in South Africa
Films shot in Seychelles
Films directed by Bronwen Hughes
Films scored by David Holmes (musician)
South African crime drama films